This is a list of the songwriting and production credits of Chuck Harmony.

Writing and producing credits

References

External links
 
 

Production discographies
Pop music discographies
Rhythm and blues discographies
Discographies of American artists